The National Petroleum Council (NPC) is an American advisory committee representing oil and natural gas industry views to the United States Secretary of Energy.

History
The council was established in 1946 at the request of President Harry S. Truman to represent industry views on any matters relating to oil and natural gas. In 1977, its role was transferred to the new Department of Energy, and the council is now formally chartered as Federal Advisory Committee with private funding.

Committee
The NPC currently has 203 members, organized and appointed by the Secretary of Energy. Individual members serve without compensation as representatives of their industry as a whole, not as lobbyists for specific companies. The committee is organized to reflect the geographic extent of the oil and gas industry while also covering all industry sectors and representing both large and small companies.

Purpose
The purpose of the NPC is "solely to advise, inform, and make recommendations to the U.S. Secretary of Energy with respect to any matter relating to oil and natural gas or to the oil and gas industries submitted to it or approved by the Secretary." The NPC prepares publicly available reports which are the result of studies conducted at the bequest of the Secretary of Energy. Since its inception, the Council has prepared over 200 reports.

References

External links
 National Petroleum Council official website

American advisory organizations
United States Department of Energy
Lobbying in the United States